Lee Harris may refer to:

 Lee Harris (politician) (born 1978), Tennessee State Senator
 Lee Harris (drummer) (born 1962), English drummer
 Lee Harris (editor) (born 1968), British editor of science fiction, fantasy and horror
 Lee Harris (figure skater) (born 1981), retired pair skater who competed internationally for the United States
 Lee Harris (South African artist) (born 1936), and candidate in the 2016 London mayoral election
 Lee Harris (guitarist) (born 1972), is a member of Nick Mason's Saucerful of Secrets band
 Lee Harris (new anchor) News anchor at 1010 WINS since 1995

See also 
 Harris Levey, comic book illustrator, also known as Lee Harris
 List of people with surname Harris